Crimmins is a surname. Notable people with the surname include:
Alice Crimmins (born 1939), 1960s American murder trial suspect
Allison Crimmins, American climate scientist
Barry Crimmins (1953–2018), American comedian
Bernard Anthony Crimmins (1919–1993) is a former offensive lineman in the National Football League
Bryan Crimmins (1919–1998), Australian rules footballer
Eileen M. Crimmins, gerontologist and Edna M. Jones Professor of Gerontology at the University of Southern California
John D. Crimmins (1844–1917), New York City contractor and philanthropist
John Hugh Crimmins (1919–2007), American diplomat
Joseph Ray Crimmins (1921–1989), American politician
Mark Crimmins, Anglo-American writer, memoirist, short story writer
Michael Crimmins (born 1974), Irish hurler
Peter Crimmins (1948–1976), rover for the Hawthorn Football Club
Roy Crimmins (1929–2014), English jazz musician